"One More Time" is a song recorded by South Korean girl group Twice. It is the group's first Japanese maxi single, featuring three other tracks. It was released on October 18, 2017, by Warner Music Japan.

The single album achieved the biggest first-day sales and became the fastest-selling album of any South Korean girl group in Japan. With over 250,000 unit sales, it is the first Japanese single by a K-pop girl group that earned Platinum certification by the Recording Industry Association of Japan (RIAJ).

Background and release
On September 15, 2017, Twice announced the release of their first Japanese single titled "One More Time", along with several teaser images for the new track. The group previously teased the single in August at the end of a promotional video titled #Twice Spot Movie with a caption "One More Time…?" at the end of the video. The song was first revealed on Tokyo FM's School of Lock! on October 5.

The single's CD has four versions: Standard Edition, Fanclub Edition (Halloween Version), First Press Limited Edition A (CD and DVD that contains the song's music video and its movie making) and First Press Limited Edition B (CD and DVD that contains music video dance version and jacket shooting making movie).

On February 7, 2018, "One More Time" and "Luv Me" were digitally released on various South Korean music sites, along with the release of "Candy Pop".

Composition

"One More Time" was composed by Na.Zu.Na, Yu-ki Kokubo and Yhanael, with lyrics written by Natsumi Watanabe and Yhanael. Yhanael previously wrote the lyrics for Twice's "Like Ooh-Ahh (Japanese ver.)". The song enlists some 90's electronica vibes that deviate from the EDM with a combination of the blaring synths and loud bass.

Music video
The music video teasers were released on September 25 and 29, 2017. Ahead of the single's official release, "One More Time"'s full music video was uploaded online on October 6.

It features Twice dressed in bright colors as the members are seen performing a variety of sports activities: Nayeon and Jihyo have a tennis match scene reminiscent of the anime The Prince of Tennis. Chaeyoung and Dahyun have a boxing face off refereed by Jeongyeon with Sana as the ring girl. Momo, Mina and Tzuyu are rhythmic gymnasts performing with hoop, ball and ribbon, respectively.

Promotion
On October 17, 2017, Twice performed "One More Time" for the first time in the television morning program Sukkri on Nippon TV. Two days later, the group appeared as guest in popular program School of Lock! on Tokyo FM, their debut on-air radio broadcast in Japan. On October 22, they performed "One More Time", "Like Ooh-Ahh (Japanese ver.)" and "TT (Japanese ver.)" on Fuji TV's Mezamashi TV Presents T-Spook – Tokyo Halloween Party, one of the largest Halloween events in the country.

Commercial performance
Prior to dropping the CD single, "One More Time" entered the Billboard Japan Hot 100 at number 57 and spent four weeks on the chart until it reached the top spot, one week after its official release. The lead single also debuted at number 15 on Billboard charts' World Digital Song Sales, then rose into the Top 10 at number 8 the following week.

The CD single debuted atop the daily ranking of Oricon Singles Chart with 94,957 units sold on its release day. It was also reported that almost 300,000 copies were shipped out in pre-orders, while Billboard Japan recorded 150,425 unit sales from October 16–18, 2017 only. On its second day, "One More Time" become the fastest-selling K-pop girl group album in Japan based on first week figures. The previous record holder was Kara, which sold 122,820 copies during its first week in 2011. 329,400 copies were shipped as of February 23, 2018.

Track listing

Content production
Credits adapted from CD single liner notes.

Locations
 Recording
 JYPE Studios, Seoul, South Korea

 Mixing
 Mirrorball Studios, North Hollywood, California ("One More Time")

 Mastering
 Sterling Sound, New York City, New York

Personnel
 JYP Entertainment staff

 Song Ji-eun "Shannen" (JYP Entertainment Japan) – executive producer
 Jimmy Jeong (JYP Entertainment) – executive producer
 J. Y. Park "The Asiansoul" – producer
 Yasuhiro Suziki (JYP Entertainment Japan) – strategic planning
 Rinko Narita (JYP Entertainment Japan) – A&R
 Lee Ji-hoon (JYP Entertainment Japan) – A&R
 Ayumi Saiki (JYP Entertainment Japan) – artist and fan marketing
 Lee Seong-ah (JYP Entertainment Japan) – artist and fan marketing
 Kim Sung-bub (JYP Entertainment Japan) – artist and fan marketing
 Hong Mina (JYP Entertainment Japan) – artist and fan marketing
 Kang Minju (JYP Entertainment Japan) – artist and fan marketing
 Cho Hae-sung (JYP Entertainment) – management in Korea
 Kang Youngkerl (JYP Entertainment) – management in Korea
 Sun Jin-chul (JYP Entertainment) – management in Korea
 Shin Hyun-kuk – Twice TF
 Chung Hae-joon – Twice TF
 Jung Jun-kil – Twice TF
 Joo Bo-ra – Twice TF
 Shin Seon-hwa – Twice TF
 Shin Sae-rom – Twice TF
 Kim Na-yeon – Twice TF
 Yoo Jong-beom – Twice TF
 Park Rae-chang – Twice TF
 Jun Yong-jin – Twice TF
 Yang Da-seol – Twice TF
 Jung Kyoung-hee (JYP Entertainment Japan) – administration
 Kim Tae-hwa (JYP Entertainment Japan) – administration
 Park Nam-yong (JYP Entertainment) – choreographer
 Kim Hyung-woong (JYP Entertainment) – choreographer
 Yun Hee-soo (JYP Entertainment) – choreographer
 Na Tae-hoon (JYP Entertainment) – choreographer
 Yoo Kwang-yeol (JYP Entertainment) – choreographer
 Kang Da-sol (JYP Entertainment) – choreographer
 Lee Tae-sub (JYP Entertainment) – recording engineer
 Choi Hye-jin (JYP Entertainment) – recording engineer
 Eom Se-hee (JYP Entertainment) – recording engineer
 Lim Hong-jin (JYP Entertainment) – recording engineer
 Jang Han-soo (JYP Entertainment) – recording engineer
 Lee Jeong-yun "Lia" (JYP Publishing) – publishing
 Kim Min-ji (JYP Publishing) – publishing
 Shin Da-ye (JYP Publishing) – publishing

 Warner Music Japan staff

 Kaz Kobayashi – executive producer
 Hayato Kajino – supervisor
 Rie Sawaoka – supervisor
 Yukiyasu "German" Fujii – chief A&R
 Toshio Kai – A&R
 Nao Fuse – A&R
 Norihiro Fukuda – A&R
 Hidetsugu Sato – sales promotion
 Naoki Takami – digital planning and marketing
 Yoshinori Ishii – digital planning and marketing
 Mamoru Fukumitsu – WMJ "JYP room"
 Han Gui-taek – WMJ "JYP room"
 Kimi Yoneda – WMJ "JYP room"
 Eom Eun-kyung – WMJ "JYP room"
 Kim Jang-ho – WMJ "JYP room"
 Masayo Kuroda – product coordination
 Mizuho Makizaka – A&R secretary
 Momoko Kitasato – A&R secretary

 Japanese version recording staff
 Goei Ito (Obelisk) – music director
 Yu-ki Kokubo (Obelisk) – recording director
 Satoshi Sasamoto – Pro Tools operation

 Design staff

 Toshiyuki Suzuki (United Lounge Tokyo) – art direction
 Yasuhiro Uaeda (United Lounge Tokyo) – design
 Tommy – photography
 Choi Hee-sun at F. Choi – style director
 Lim Ji-hyun at F. Choi – style director
 Lee Jin-young at F. Choi – assistant stylist
 Ju Young-suk at F. Choi – assistant stylist
 Heo Su-yeon at F. Choi – assistant stylist
 Park Nae-joo – hair director
 Kim Se-gyeong – hair director
 Han So-hee – assistant hair director
 Han Gwi-seon – assistant hair director
 Won Jung-yo – makeup director
 Choi Su-ji – assistant makeup director
 Jung You-jung – assistant makeup director

 Movie staff

 Kim Young-jo (Naive Production) – music video director
 Yoo Seung-woo (Naive Production) – music video director
 Han Gui-taek – music video making and jacket shooting making movie director
 Yu Yamaguchi (Warner Music Mastering) – DVD authoring

 Other personnel

 Na.Zu.Na – session instruments (on "One More Time")
 Jae-pil Jung – guitar (on "One More Time")
 Albin Nordqvist – session instruments (on "Luv Me")
 Twice – background vocals
 Ikuko Tsutsumi – background vocals
 Tony Maserati – mixing engineer (on "One More Time")
 Ryosuke Kataoka – mixing engineer (on "Luv Me")
 Chris Gehringer – mastering engineer

Charts

Weekly charts

Year-end charts

Certifications

References

2017 singles
2017 songs
J-pop songs
Japanese-language songs
Warner Music Japan singles
Twice (group) songs
Oricon Weekly number-one singles
Billboard Japan Hot 100 number-one singles